Cwmdonkin Park is an urban park situated in the Uplands area of Swansea, Wales. The park has a bandstand, children's play area, water gardens, tennis courts, and a bowling green. The park is listed on the Cadw/ICOMOS Register of Parks and Gardens of Special Historic Interest in Wales.

History 
The use of the land for public recreation originated with the creation of Cwmdonkin reservoir around 1850 by William Henry Smith and the Swansea Waterworks Company. The records of the Borough of Swansea and the Cambrian newspaper detail the somewhat controversial use of public funds to take over and run "the destructive pit at Cwmdonkin, euphemistically called a reservoir".

The first suggestion to landscape the grounds around the reservoir was raised in 1853 but it was not until 1874 that Swansea Council purchased two fields from Mr James Walters for £4,650 to create the park which was opened on 24 July 1874. There was some criticism that the park was in an essentially wealthy, middle-class area of town: this led to the emergence of the "Open Spaces Movement" led by William Thomas of Lan, which campaigned for more parks for deprived working class areas.

Cwmdonkin Reservoir was filled in with rubble in the 1950s and landscaped to become a children's play area.

Dylan Thomas

Poet Dylan Thomas grew up near the park at 5 Cwmdonkin Drive.

The park features heavily in the radio broadcasts, Return Journey and Reminiscences of Childhood, and the poem, The Hunchback in the Park. A memorial stone with lines from Fern Hill was placed in the park in 1963.

Refurbishment 
On 7 September 2013, after an extensive £1.39m refurbishment, the park reopened in time to celebrate the 100th anniversary of Dylan Thomas's birth. The park is listed at Grade II on the Cadw/ICOMOS Register of Parks and Gardens of Special Historic Interest in Wales.

References

Parks in Swansea
Registered historic parks and gardens in Swansea